Petter Wilhelm Blichfeldt Schjerven (born 20 October 1967) is a Norwegian television host, known from Typisk norsk<ref>[http://www.aftenposten.no/kul_und/tv/article1304958.ece "Typisk norsk" won journalism price]  Aftenposten (in Norwegian)
</ref> which aired on NRK, the Norwegian Broadcasting Corporation. Schjerven has previously worked as the host and scriptwriter for the children's program  and as the producer of the radio program  on NRK P3, among others.

Schjerven was awarded Gullruten, a Norwegian television award, for best male television host in 2005.

He has a cand.mag. degree and has studied psychology, Norwegian, media studies, and philosophy.

He is the older brother of actor Erik A. Schjerven.

References

External links

1967 births
Living people
Norwegian television presenters
NRK people
University of Oslo alumni